Boubacar Salam Bagili (born 7 December 1994) is a Mauritanian football player who currently plays for Nouadhibou and the Mauritanian national team.

International goals 
As of match played 16 July 2017. Mauritania score listed first, score column indicates score after each Bagili goal.

References

External links 
 
 

1994 births
Living people

Algerian Ligue Professionnelle 1 players
Mauritania international footballers
Mauritanian footballers
Expatriate footballers in Algeria
US Biskra players
CS Hammam-Lif players
Tunisian Ligue Professionnelle 1 players
Mauritanian expatriate footballers
Mauritanian expatriate sportspeople in Algeria
Association football forwards
FC Nouadhibou players
ACS Ksar players
Mauritanian expatriate sportspeople in Tunisia
Expatriate footballers in Tunisia
Mauritania A' international footballers
2018 African Nations Championship players